Franklin Ray Funk (born August 30, 1935) is an American former Major League Baseball pitcher. He played from 1960–63 for the Cleveland Indians and Milwaukee Braves. During a 4-year baseball career, he compiled 20 wins, 150 strikeouts, and a 3.01 ERA.

Born in Washington, D.C., he was signed by the New York Giants as an amateur free agent in 1954. Funk was acquired by Cleveland's AAA International League Toronto Maple Leafs team prior to the 1959 season. He made the most of his debut after a late season call-up from the Maple Leafs in September 1960, finishing with a 4–2 record, a 1.99 earned run average, and 1 save in just nine games for Cleveland.

His best season was 1961, when he posted a won-loss record of 11–11 and led Cleveland with 11 saves and an ERA of 3.31, appearing in 56 games. Two of his victories, both recorded in May, involved pitching over seven innings per game in relief during 15-inning games against the Baltimore Orioles and Minnesota Twins.

After a 2–1 season with a 3.24 ERA and six saves in 1962 over 47 games, he was traded to the Milwaukee Braves along with outfielders Don Dillard and Ty Cline for first baseman Joe Adcock and pitcher Jack Curtis. He pitched one season for the Braves, posting a record of 3–3 over 25 games, with an ERA of 2.68 in 1963.

He served as a minor league manager and pitching coach, and also coached in the Major Leagues with the San Francisco Giants, Seattle Mariners, Kansas City Royals and Colorado Rockies.

References

External links

Retrosheet
Venezuelan Professional Baseball League

1935 births
American University alumni
Arizona Instructional League Giants players
Atlanta Crackers players
Austin Braves players
Baseball players from Washington, D.C.
Bethesda-Chevy Chase High School alumni
Cleveland Indians players
Colorado Rockies (baseball) coaches
Corpus Christi Giants players
Danville Leafs players
Denver Bears players
Eugene Emeralds managers
Johnstown Johnnies players
Kansas City Royals coaches
Leones del Caracas players
American expatriate baseball players in Venezuela
Living people
Major League Baseball bullpen coaches
Major League Baseball pitchers
Major League Baseball pitching coaches
Mayfield Clothiers players
Milwaukee Braves players
Phoenix Giants players
Richmond Braves players
St. Cloud Rox players
Salt Lake City Bees players
San Francisco Giants coaches
Seattle Mariners coaches
Sioux City Soos players
Tacoma Giants players
Toronto Maple Leafs (International League) players
American expatriate baseball players in Canada